The Manual on Uniform Traffic Control Devices for Streets and Highways (usually referred to as the Manual on Uniform Traffic Control Devices, abbreviated MUTCD) is a document issued by the Federal Highway Administration (FHWA) of the United States Department of Transportation (USDOT) to specify the standards by which traffic signs, road surface markings, and signals are designed, installed, and used. In the United States, all traffic control devices must legally conform to these standards. The manual is used by state and local agencies as well as private construction firms to ensure that the traffic control devices they use conform to the national standard. While some state agencies have developed their own sets of standards, including their own MUTCDs, these must substantially conform to the federal MUTCD.

The MUTCD defines the content and placement of traffic signs, while design specifications are detailed in a companion volume, Standard Highway Signs. This manual defines the specific dimensions, colors, and fonts of each sign and road marking. The National Committee on Uniform Traffic Control Devices (NCUTCD) advises the FHWA on additions, revisions, and changes to the MUTCD.

The United States is among the countries that have not ratified the Vienna Convention on Road Signs and Signals. The first edition of the MUTCD was published in 1935, 33 years before the Vienna Convention was signed in 1968. The MUTCD differs significantly from the European-influenced Vienna Convention, and an attempt to adopt several of the Vienna Convention's standards during the 1970s led to confusion among many US drivers.

History 
At the start of the 20th century—the early days of the rural highway—each road was promoted and maintained by automobile clubs of private individuals, who generated revenue through club membership and increased business along cross-country routes. However, each highway had its own set of signage, usually designed to promote the highway rather than to assist in the direction and safety of travelers. In fact, conflicts between these automobile clubs frequently led to multiple sets of signs—sometimes as many as eleven—being erected on the same highway.

Government action to begin resolving the wide variety of signage that had cropped up did not occur until the late 1910s and early 1920s when groups from Indiana, Minnesota, and Wisconsin began surveying existing road signs in order to develop road signage standards. They reported their findings to the Mississippi Valley Association of Highway Departments, which adopted their suggestions in 1922 for the shapes to be used for road signs. These suggestions included the familiar circular railroad crossing sign and octagonal stop sign.

In January 1927, the American Association of State Highway Officials (AASHO) published the Manual and Specifications for the Manufacture, Display, and Erection of U.S. Standard Road Markers and Signs to set standards for traffic control devices used on rural roads. Despite the title, this manual did not have any guidance on pavement markings.  In the archaic American English of the 1920s, the term "road marker" was sometimes used to describe traffic control devices which modern speakers would now call "signs." In 1930, the National Conference on Street and Highway Safety (NCSHS) published the Manual on Street Traffic Signs, Signals, and Markings, which set similar standards for urban settings, but also added specific guidance on traffic signals, pavement markings, and safety zones. Although the two manuals were quite similar, both organizations immediately recognized that the existence of two slightly different manuals was unnecessarily awkward, and in 1931 AASHO and NCSHS formed a Joint Committee to develop a uniform standard for both urban streets and rural roads. This standard was the MUTCD.

The original edition of the Manual on Uniform Traffic Control Devices for Streets and Highways was published in 1935. Since that time, subsequent editions of the manual have been published with numerous minor updates occurring between, each taking into consideration changes in usage and size of the nation's system of roads as well as improvements in technology.

In 1942, the Joint Committee was expanded to include the Institute of Transportation Engineers, then known as the Institute of Traffic Engineers.  The single most controversial and heavily debated issue during the early years of the MUTCD was the color of center lines on roads. The 1948 version of the MUTCD settled the debate in favor of white, and also changed the standard color of stop signs from yellow to red. However, the 1948 MUTCD also allowed for two major exceptions to white center lines: yellow was recommended but not mandatory for double center lines on multi-lane highways and for center lines in no-passing zones.

In 1949, the United Nations Conference on Road and Motor Transport launched a research project to develop a worldwide uniform scheme for highway signs.  In 1951, the UN conducted experiments in the U.S. to compare the effectiveness of national traffic sign standards from around the world. Signs from six countries were placed along the road for test subjects to gauge their legibility at a distance. The test strips were located along Ohio State Route 104 near Columbus, U.S. Route 250 and Virginia State Route 53 near Charlottesville, Minnesota State Highway 101 near Minneapolis, and other roads in New York. France, Chile, Turkey, India, and Southern Rhodesia reciprocated by installing MUTCD signs on their roads. In the U.S., the experiments attracted unexpected controversy and curious onlookers who posed a hazard. However, the experiments eventually led to the Vienna Convention on Road Signs and Signals.  

In 1953, after cooperating with the UN conference's initial experiments, the United States declined to sign or ratify the UN's then-proposed protocol for a worldwide system of uniform road signs.  There were two major reasons behind this decision. First, most U.S. roads and streets were (and still are) under state jurisdiction.  Second, the United States was developing modern controlled-access highways at the time (culminating in the creation of the Interstate Highway System in 1956), and the novel problems presented by such new high-speed highways required rapid innovations in road signing and marking "that would definitely be impaired by adherence to any international code".

In 1960, the National Joint Committee on Uniform Traffic Control Devices was again reorganized to include representatives of the National Association of Counties and the National League of Cities, then known as the American Municipal Association. In 1961, the MUTCD was again revised to make yellow center lines mandatory for the two exceptions where they had previously been recommended.  The 1961 edition was the first edition to provide for uniform signs and barricades to direct traffic around road construction and maintenance operations.

In 1966, Congress passed the Highway Safety Act, which is now codified at  et seq. It required all states to create a highway safety program by December 31, 1968, and to adhere to uniform standards promulgated by the U.S. Department of Transportation as a condition of receiving federal highway-aid funds. The penalty for non-compliance was a 10% reduction in funding. ((a)(1), also enacted in 1966, authorizes federal agencies to incorporate by reference technical standards published elsewhere, which means the agency may merely cite the standard and need not republish its entire text as part of the appropriate regulation.) Thus, what was formerly a quasi-official project became an official one. States are allowed to supplement the MUTCD but must remain in "substantial conformance" with the national MUTCD and adopt changes within two years after they are adopted by FHWA.

The 1971 edition of the MUTCD included several significant standards. The MUTCD imposed a consistent color code for road surface markings by requiring all center lines dividing opposing traffic on two-way roads to be always painted in yellow (instead of white, which was to always demarcate lanes moving in the same direction), and also required that all highway guide signs (not just those on Interstate Highways) contain white text on a green background. 

Another major change, inspired by the Vienna Convention on Road Signs and Signals of 1968, was that the 1971 MUTCD expressed a preference for a transition to adoption of symbols on signs in lieu of words "as rapidly as public acceptance and other considerations permit." During what was then expected to be a transition period, the MUTCD allowed state highway departments to use optional explanatory word plaques with symbol signs and to continue using the previous standard word message signs in certain cases. Robert Conner, the chief of the traffic control systems division of the Federal Highway Administration during the 1970s, believed that symbol signs were "usually more effective than words in situations where reaction time and comprehension are important."  Conner was active in the Joint Committee and also represented the United States at international meetings on road traffic safety. Most of the repainting to the 1971 standard was done between 1971 and 1974, with a deadline of 1978 for the changeover of both the markings and signage.

The U.S. adoption of several Vienna Convention-inspired symbol signs during the 1970s was a failure. For example, the lane drop symbol sign was criticized as baffling to U.S. drivers—who saw a "big milk bottle"—and therefore quite dangerous, since by definition it was supposed to be used in situations where drivers were about to run out of road and needed to merge into another lane immediately.  American highway safety experts ridiculed it as the "Rain Ahead" sign. Many American motorists were bewildered by the Vienna Convention's symbol sign with two children on it, requiring it to be supplemented with a "School Xing" plaque. The 1971 MUTCD's preference for a rapid transition to symbols over words quietly disappeared in the 1978 MUTCD. The 2000 and 2003 MUTCDs each eliminated a symbol sign that had long been intended to replace a word message sign: "Pavement Ends" (in 2000) and "Narrow Bridge" (in 2003).

On January 2, 2008, FHWA published a Notice of Proposed Amendment in the Federal Register containing a proposal for a new edition of the MUTCD, and published the draft content of this new edition on the MUTCD website for public review and comment. Comments were accepted until the end of July 2008. The new edition was published in 2009. Revisions to the 2009 edition were then published in 2012.

On December 14, 2020, FHWA published a Notice of Proposed Amendment in the Federal Register containing a proposal for an eleventh edition of the MUTCD, publishing the draft content of this new edition online for public review and comment until March 15, 2021. The adoption of the Infrastructure Investment and Jobs Act (IIJA) in November 2021 also directs the USDOT to update the MUTCD by no later than May 15, 2023, and at least every 4 years thereafter.

Development 
Proposed additions and revisions to the MUTCD are recommended to FHWA by the National Committee on Uniform Traffic Control Devices (NCUTCD), a private, non-profit organization. The NCUTCD also recommends interpretations of the MUTCD to other agencies that use the MUTCD, such as state departments of transportation. NCUTCD develops public and professional awareness of the principles of safe traffic control devices and practices and provides a forum for qualified individuals to exchange professional information.

The NCUTCD is supported by twenty-one sponsoring organizations, including transportation and engineering industry groups (such as AASHTO and ASCE), safety organizations (such as the National Safety Council and Advocates for Highway and Auto Safety), and the American Automobile Association. Each sponsoring organization promotes members to serve as voting delegates within the NCUTCD.

Adoption 

Eighteen states have adopted the national MUTCD as is. Twenty-two states, the District of Columbia, Puerto Rico, and the United States Department of Defense through the Military Surface Deployment and Distribution Command (SDDC) have all adopted supplements to the MUTCD. Ten states have adopted their own editions of the MUTCD "in substantial conformance to" an edition of the national MUTCD, annotated throughout with state-specific modifications and clarifications. The Guam Department of Public Works has also adopted the MUTCD in some form.

The following state-specific MUTCD editions are currently in effect:

 California Department of Transportation: California Manual on Uniform Traffic Control Devices (CA MUTCD)
 Delaware Department of Transportation: Delaware Manual on Uniform Traffic Control Devices (DE MUTCD)
 Indiana Department of Transportation: Indiana Manual on Uniform Traffic Control Devices (IMUTCD)
 Maryland State Highway Administration: Maryland Manual on Uniform Traffic Control Devices (MdMUTCD)
 Michigan Department of Transportation: Michigan Manual on Uniform Traffic Control Devices (MMUTCD)
 Minnesota Department of Transportation: Minnesota Manual on Uniform Traffic Control Devices (MN MUTCD)
 Missouri Department of Transportation: Engineering Policy Guide (EPG), section 900
 Ohio Department of Transportation: Ohio Manual of Uniform Traffic Control Devices (OMUTCD)
 Texas Department of Transportation: Texas Manual on Uniform Traffic Control Devices (TMUTCD)
 Utah Department of Transportation: Utah Manual on Uniform Traffic Control Devices (Utah MUTCD)

Other jurisdictions 

The United States is among the majority of countries around the world that have not ratified the Vienna Convention on Road Signs and Signals (based primarily on European signage traditions), and the FHWA MUTCD differs significantly from the Vienna Convention. Apart from the 1971 effort to adopt several Vienna Convention-inspired symbol signs (as explained above), achieving worldwide uniformity in traffic control devices was never a priority for AASHTO because the number of motorists driving regularly on multiple continents was relatively small during the 20th century.

Warning signs (alerting drivers of unexpected or hazardous conditions) tend to be more verbose than their Vienna Convention counterparts. On the other hand, MUTCD guide signs (directing or informing road users of their location or of destinations) tend to be less verbose, since they are optimized for reading at high speeds on freeways and expressways.

The MUTCD lacks a mandatory sign group like the Vienna Convention does, a separate category for those signs like "Right Turn Only" and "Keep Right" that tell traffic what it must do instead of what it must not do. Instead, the MUTCD primarily classifies them with the other regulatory signs that inform drivers of traffic regulations.

The MUTCD has become widely influential outside the United States; for example, the use of yellow stripes to divide opposing traffic has been widely adopted throughout the Western Hemisphere. Australia, New Zealand, Ireland and some Asian countries use many road signs influenced by the MUTCD.

Canada

For road signs in Canada, the Transportation Association of Canada (TAC) publishes its own Manual of Uniform Traffic Control Devices for Canada for use by Canadian jurisdictions. Although it serves a similar role to the FHWA MUTCD, it has been independently developed and has a number of key differences with its US counterpart, most notably the inclusion of bilingual (English/French) signage for jurisdictions such as New Brunswick and Ontario with significant anglophone and francophone population, a heavier reliance on symbols rather than text legends and metric measurements instead of imperial.

The Ministry of Transportation of Ontario (MTO) also has historically used its own MUTCD which bore many similarities to the TAC MUTCDC. However, as of approximately 2000, MTO has been developing the Ontario Traffic Manual (OTM), a series of smaller volumes each covering different aspects of traffic control (e.g., regulatory signs, warning signs, sign design principles, traffic signals, etc.).

Central America
For road signs in Central American countries, the Central American Integration System (SICA) publishes its own , a Central American equivalent to the US MUTCD.

See also  
 Comparison of MUTCD-influenced traffic signs
 Comparison of traffic signs in English-speaking territories
 Road signs in the United States

References

External links 

 
 National Committee on Uniform Traffic Control Devices (NCUTCD) website
 MUTCD History by H. Gene Hawkins